Litwin is a Polish surname , meaning "Lithuanian person" or anyone from the Grand Duchy of Lithuania. It may refer to:

 Czesław Litwin (born 1955), Polish politician
 Eric Litwin (born 1966), American storyteller and musician
 Leonard Litwin (1914−2017), American real estate developer

See also
 
 Litvak (disambiguation)
 Litvin
 Litvinov
 Litwinowicz

Polish-language surnames
Jewish surnames
Surnames of Lithuanian origin
Ethnonymic surnames